Urville may refer to:

Communes in France:
Urville, Aube, in the Aube département 
Urville, Calvados, in the Calvados département 
Urville, Manche, in the Manche département 
Urville, Vosges, in the Vosges département
Urville-Nacqueville, in the Manche département
Urville (imaginary city) created by autistic savant Gilles Trehin

Other:
Jules Dumont d'Urville was a French explorer
D'Urville Island, New Zealand, an island in New Zealand
Dumont d'Urville Station, a French research station in the Antarctic